The 1987 Idaho Vandals football team represented the University of Idaho in the 1987 NCAA Division I-AA football season. The Vandals, led by second-year head coach Keith Gilbertson, were members of the Big Sky Conference and played their home games at the Kibbie Dome, an indoor facility on campus in Moscow, Idaho.

The Vandals won their second conference title in three seasons, and made the I-AA playoffs for the third consecutive season.

Notable games
Following a non-conference loss at home to Central Michigan, and a road loss to struggling intrastate rival  Idaho won its final six games of the regular season. The Vandals defeated Nevada for only the second time in the ten meetings since the Wolf Pack joined the Big Sky in 1979, and defeated rival Boise State for the sixth consecutive year, the sixth of twelve straight over the Broncos.

Division I-AA playoffs
For the third consecutive season, Idaho returned to the 16-team I-AA playoffs. The Vandals hosted conference foe Weber State, whom they had defeated in Utah four weeks earlier by three points.  The Wildcats won the rematch  before a sparse crowd at the Kibbie Dome two days after Thanksgiving, ending the Vandals' season

Notable players
The 1987 team included two future NFL players with lengthy pro careers: guard Mark Schlereth and redshirt sophomore John Friesz, a future collegiate hall of fame quarterback as a three-year starter

Schedule

Roster

All-conference
Six Vandals were named to the all-conference team: quarterback John Friesz, tackle Greg Hale, guard Todd Neu, defensive end Pete Wilkins, safety Ernest Sanders, and cornerback Virgil Paulsen. Second team selections were wide receiver Eric Jorgensen, tight end Craig Robinson, and punter John Pleas. Honorable mention were wide receiver/kick returner John Jake, running back Todd Hoiness, center Steve Unger, defensive linemen Kord Smith and Jim Routos, and placekicker 

Friesz, from Coeur d'Alene, was also named the Big Sky's outstanding offensive player.

References

External links
 Gem of the Mountains: 1988 University of Idaho yearbook – 1987 football season
Idaho Argonaut – student newspaper – 1987 editions

Idaho
Idaho Vandals football seasons
Big Sky Conference football champion seasons
Idaho Vandals football